A Certain Smile is a 1958 American drama film directed by Jean Negulesco, based on the book of the same name by Françoise Sagan.

Plot
In Paris, beautiful Dominique Vallon is involved with a young man, Bertrand Griot, until suddenly entering into an unwise week-long romance with his wealthy and married uncle, Luc Ferrand.

Cast
 Rossano Brazzi as Luc Ferrand
 Joan Fontaine as Françoise Ferrand
 Bradford Dillman as Bertrand Griot
 Christine Carère as Dominique Vallon
 Eduard Franz as M. Vallon
 Katherine Locke as Mme. Vallon
 Kathryn Givney as Mme. Griot
 Steven Geray as Denis
 Johnny Mathis as Himself
 Trude Wyler as Mme. Denis
 Sandy Livingston as Catherine
 Renate Hoy as Mlle. Minot
 Muzaffer Tema as Pierre

Production
Christine Carère was cast in the main role, although she didn't know any English at the time. She was brought to Hollywood and trained for ten months before filming. The Production Code Administration only authorized the film after substantial changes to the novel's story line. Negulesco later agreed "that A Certain Smile has not much of Sagan. She herself did not like it and she also wrote an article against it. She was right in saying that that was not her book."

Awards and nominations

References

Bibliography

External links
 

1958 films
1958 romantic drama films
20th Century Fox films
American romantic drama films
1950s English-language films
Films scored by Alfred Newman
Films based on French novels
Films based on works by Françoise Sagan
Films directed by Jean Negulesco
Films set in Paris
CinemaScope films
1950s American films